Kolahun is a town in the Kolahun District of Lofa County, Liberia.

Populated places in Liberia